Krasnaya Niva is a rural locality (a selo) in Volokonovsky District, Belgorod Oblast, Russia. The population was 227 as of 2010. There is 1 street.

Geography 
Krasnaya Niva is located 13 km southeast of Volokonovka (the district's administrative centre) by road. Orlinoye is the nearest rural locality.

References 

Rural localities in Volokonovsky District